The Communist Party of Spain (8th and 9th Congresses) (in Spanish: Partido Comunista de España (VIII y IX Congresos)) was a pro-Soviet splinter group of Communist Party of Spain (PCE). 

PCE (VIII-IX) was one of many groups that broke away from PCE during the period when Santiago Carrillo held the post of PCE general secretary and directed the party towards Eurocommunism; it was founded in 1971. A prominent leader of the new party was Agustín Gómez. It published a magazine called Mundo Obrero (same name as the publication of PCE).

In 1980 PCE (VIII-IX) fused with Workers' Communist Party to form the Unified Communist Party of Spain. PCEU was later instrumental in creating the Communist Party of the Peoples of Spain in 1982.

References

Vera Jiménez, Fernando (2009). «La diáspora comunista en España». Asociación de Historia Actual (HAOL). ISSN 1696-2060 (20, Otoño 2009): 34–48. PDF version

1971 establishments in Spain
1980 disestablishments in Spain
Defunct communist parties in Spain
Political parties disestablished in 1980
Political parties established in 1971